The Payne Hotel is a former stagecoach inn located along Highway 33 in Saukville, Wisconsin. Deemed worthy of preservation, the hotel has been listed on the National Register of Historic Places since March 14, 1991.

William Payne was born in London in 1806 and immigrated to the U.S. in 1826. In 1846 he founded Saukville, building a sawmill and gristmill on the Milwaukee River. In 1848 he built the Payne Hotel where the old Dekorra Military Road met the old Green Bay Trail. It served as a stagecoach stop for people traveling between Chicago/Milwaukee and Green Bay.

The hotel is a 2.5-story wood-frame building. It is in Greek Revival style, with a low-pitched roof, cornice returns, and symmetric windows and chimneys. Along with serving travelers, it hosted dances for locals in the ballroom on the third floor.  It may well have hosted local meetings too, since Payne served as a Town Supervisor, Commissioner of Highways, and Justice of the Peace.

See also
 National Register of Historic Places listings in Ozaukee County, Wisconsin

References

Buildings and structures in Ozaukee County, Wisconsin
Hotel buildings on the National Register of Historic Places in Wisconsin
Commercial buildings completed in 1847
1847 establishments in Wisconsin Territory
National Register of Historic Places in Sauk County, Wisconsin